Ogoh-ogoh are statues built for the Ngrupuk parade, which takes place on the eve of Nyepi day in Bali, Indonesia. Ogoh-ogoh normally take the form of mythological beings, mostly demons. As with many creative endeavours based on Balinese Hinduism, the creation of Ogoh-ogoh represents spiritual aims inspired by Hindu philosophy.

The main purpose of the making of Ogoh-ogoh is the purification of the natural environment of any spiritual pollutants emitted from the activities of living beings (especially humans). The forms of Ogoh-ogoh represent the Bhuta-Kala (Bhuta: eternal energy, Kala: eternal time), according to Hindu teachings. The imperceptible potentials of nature cannot be thoroughly explored by anyone. Philosophically, civilized men are required to manage the natural resources without damaging the environment itself.

Aside from being the symbol of Bhuta-Kala, Ogoh-ogoh is considered a symbol of modes of nature that form the malicious characters of living beings. Each village usually builds one Ogoh-ogoh mainly built by each village's Seka Truna Truni (Balinese village's youth organization), but often some smaller ogoh-ogoh also built by groups of children around the village. Some artists also usually build one. After being paraded on a convoy around the town, finally it is burnt to ashes in a cemetery as a symbol of self-purification.

An Ogoh-ogoh is normally standing on a pad built of timber planks and bamboos. The pad is designed to sustain the Ogoh-ogoh while it is being lifted and carried around the village or the town square. There are normally eight or more men carrying the Ogoh-ogoh on their shoulders. This procession is accompanied by orchestral music performed by the youth. The use of flares is also a main part of the parade.

During the procession, the Ogoh-ogoh is rotated counter-clockwise three times. This act is done at every T-junction and crossroad of the village. Rotating the effigies during the cremational parade and the eve of Nyepi represents the contact of the bodies with the spirits. It is intended to bewilder the evil spirits so that they go away and cease harming human beings.

The Ogoh-ogoh is a very recent addition to the Nyepi ceremonies, first appearing in Denpasar in the early 1980s.  At that time, they were carefully monitored for any criticism of the Suharto regime.

See also
 Namahage – demons in Japan celebrated on new year

References 

Balinese art
Balinese mythology